The North Shore Historic District is a historic district in North Beach, Miami Beach, Florida, United States. The district is roughly bounded by 87th Street, Collins Avenue, 73rd Street, and Hawthorne Avenue. The architecture in the district is primarily of the Miami Modernism style, unique to greater Miami. Other architectural styles are reflected in the district, including Mediterranean Revival, Art Deco, and Moderne.

References

External links

Historic districts on the National Register of Historic Places in Florida
National Register of Historic Places in Miami-Dade County, Florida